Captain George William Bulmer (1 September 1898 – 5 April 1987) was an American-born Canadian flying ace in World War I. He was credited with nine aerial victories.

Early life
George William Bulmer was born in Dixon, Illinois, USA on 1 September 1898. His parents were British. He worked as an accountant before enlisting in the Royal Air Force in Toronto, Canada in 1917.

World War I
By early 1918, Bulmer had completed training and been posted to 22 Squadron. He scored his first aerial victory on 6 March 1918, and continued to win through 9 July 1918. His exploits earned him a Military Cross, which was gazetted on 16 September 1918:

List of aerial victories

Post World War I
There is no reliable account of his later years, although it is known that he died in San Diego, California, USA on 5 April 1987.

Endnotes

References
 

Canadian World War I flying aces
1898 births
1987 deaths
People from Dixon, Illinois
Royal Air Force officers
American emigrants to Canada